Raga Bhoopeshwari is a Hindustani classical raga.

Origin 
The Bhoopeshwari raga is not a traditional raga.

It is generally accepted that it was created between the 1990s and 2000s. It may have been created by Ustad Alladiya Khan of the Jaipur-Atrauli Gharana, although it emerged only after his death. It is also credited to Pt. Mani Prasad of the Kirana Gharana.

An audav raga allows significant ambiguity. Since the remaining notes/ are unknown, it is quite difficult to determine its parent raga or scale. This raga does not fit into any of Bhatkhande's thaats. It may be linked to the Melakarta Chakravam, Melakart Mararanjani, Melakarta Charukesi and Melakarta Sarasangi.

The name 'Bhoopeshwari' took inspiration from the Raga Bhopali. However, this raga has various names across India. Pt. Hariprasad Chaurasia, the legendary flutist, prefers the name Raga Bhoopkali, while most of the Jaipur-Atrauli Gharana musicians use Raga Prateeksha. Other variations such as Bhoopeshri, Bhoopshri, etc. are also present. In Carnatic Music, the raga is called Raga Vaasanthi.

Technical description 
Despite its complex origin and nomenclature, this raga is not difficult to sing. It has the same notes as Raga Bhopali/Deshkar, but instead of the Shuddha Dha, uses a Komal Dha.

 Arohana : Sa Re Ga Pa dha Sa
 Avarohan : Sa dha Pa Ga Re Sa
 Vadi is Pa and Samvadi is Sa.

Time 
The Raga Bhoopeshwari is a morning raga. Its designated time is the second prahar of the morning, from 6-9 a.m.

Performances 
Possibly due to its recent creation, this raga is not widely performed. However, it has appeared in film music, light classical music and ghazals. Notable performances of Raga Bhoopeshwari include:
 Raga Bhoopeshwari by Pt. Mani Prasad
 Raga Prateeksha by Smt. Ashwini Bhide Deshpande
 Malavun Taak Deep by Lata Mangeshkar
 Ab Ke Hum Bichhde by Mehdi Hassan
 Chadta Suraj by Aziz Nazaan

Film Songs

Language:Tamil

References 

Hindustani ragas